Liban Abdi Ali (born 5 October 1988) is a Somali footballer who plays as a left winger. He previously played for Sheffield United in England, for Ferencváros in Hungary, for Olhanense in Portugal, and for FK Haugesund in his home country Norway.

Born in Somalia, Abdi grew up in Norway and holds Norwegian citizenship. He is eligible to play internationally for Somaliland, Somalia, and Norway.

Early life
Abdi was born in Burao, Somaliland, Somalia, in 1987. He spent most of his childhood in Oslo, Norway, where he attended both primary and secondary school. He lived in Stovner, an eastern borough in Oslo.

Career

Club career
Abdi moved to England with his family at the age of 14, and after a year in England he joined Sheffield United's youth academy. Abdi was the first Somali to be awarded a professional football contract at Sheffield United after impressing with the club's Academy. Following spells with Newport Pagnell Town and Buckingham Town, he was picked up by United when he subsequently moved to Sheffield with the assistance of the Football Unites, Racism Divides program.

Having signed a two-year contract in the summer of 2008, Abdi was loaned out to the Blades' sister club, Ferencváros, for the following season to gain first team experience. On his return, and after failing to break into the first team at Bramall Lane, he was released by Sheffield United in July 2010.

He then joined Ferencváros on a permanent basis, spending two seasons with the club, before moving to Portuguese Primeira Liga club Olhanense in the 2012 close season.

International career
Abdi is eligible to play for both Somaliland, Somalia, and Norway but has not represented any of them although he has stated that he wants to play for Norway. When Norway national team coach Egil "Drillo" Olsen announced his squad for the friendly match against Greece in August 2012, Drillo said that he had never seen Abdi in action despite the fact that he was playing in Portugal. Two months later Drillo stated that Abdi was not good enough for the Norwegian team, when announcing his squad for the World Cup qualifiers against Switzerland and Cyprus. In September 2018 he stated that he would not play for Somalia, but would try and help the country off the pitch.

Career statistics

References

External links
 Profile at LevskiSofia.info

1988 births
Living people
Footballers from Oslo
Association football wingers
Somalian footballers
Norwegian footballers
Newport Pagnell Town F.C. players
Buckingham Town F.C. players
Sheffield United F.C. players
Ferencvárosi TC footballers
S.C. Olhanense players
Associação Académica de Coimbra – O.A.F. players
Çaykur Rizespor footballers
PFC Levski Sofia players
Nemzeti Bajnokság I players
Ettifaq FC players
Primeira Liga players
Süper Lig players
First Professional Football League (Bulgaria) players
Saudi Professional League players
Somalian emigrants to Norway
Somalian expatriate footballers
Expatriate footballers in England
Expatriate footballers in Hungary
Expatriate footballers in Portugal
Expatriate footballers in Turkey
Expatriate footballers in Bulgaria
Expatriate footballers in Saudi Arabia
Somalian expatriate sportspeople in England
Somalian expatriate sportspeople in Hungary
Somalian expatriate sportspeople in Portugal
Somalian expatriate sportspeople in Turkey
Somalian expatriate sportspeople in Bulgaria
Naturalised citizens of Norway